David M. Smith (born February 19, 1967) is an American professional racing driver. He last competed part-time in the NASCAR Xfinity Series, driving the No. 52 Chevrolet Camaro for Jimmy Means Racing.

Racing career
Smith started racing in 2010 in the K&N Series West, running a few races every year, mostly at the Sonoma Raceway. On August 10, 2021, it was announced that Smith would make his debut in the NASCAR Xfinity Series in the race at Watkins Glen International. He would drive the Jimmy Means Racing No. 52 car. Smith started the race in 38th, finishing in 33rd.

Motorsports career results

NASCAR
(key) (Bold – Pole position awarded by qualifying time. Italics – Pole position earned by points standings or practice time. * – Most laps led.)

Xfinity Series

ARCA Menards Series West

 Season still in progress
 Ineligible for series points

References

External links
 

Living people
1967 births
NASCAR drivers
Racing drivers from California